Ceyhun Yıldızoğlu (born 6 March 1967) is a Turkish professional basketball coach. He is currently coaching the Turkish pro side Çukurova Basketbol.

Managing career

National level
 2008–2015 Turkey
 2018–2022 Turkey

Honors
 Turkish Women's Basketball League
Winner (2): 2000-01, 2002–03
Runner-up (2): 2008-09, 2010–11
 Turkish Women's President Cup
Winner (4): 2002-03, 2003–04, 2008–09, 2010–11
Runner-up (1): 2009-10
 Ronchetti Cup
Runner-up (1): 2001
Eurobasket Women
Runner-up (1): Eurobasket 2011
Third place (1):Eurobasket 2013

References

External links
Profile on TBF official web-page

1967 births
Living people
Sportspeople from Eskişehir
Turkish basketball coaches
Galatasaray S.K. (women's basketball) coaches
Turkish women's basketball coaches
Botaş SK basketball coaches